Dounia Batma (born 1 April 1991) is a Moroccan singer and actress who rose to popularity around the world as the runner-up of the first season of Arab Idol (the Arabic version of Pop Idol) on MBC. She lost the title against Egyptian contestant Carmen Suleiman. She married Mohamed Al Turk, the father of Bahraini singer Hala Al Turk.

Batma was born and raised in Hay Mohammadi, in the Ain Sebaa-Hay Mohammedi district of Casablanca, Morocco. Her father, Hamid Batma, played for different bands including Mesnawa and Nass El Ghiwane, and her uncle, Laarbi Batma, is the leader of Moroccan fusion group Nass El Ghiwane, considered by Martin Scorsese as "Africa's Rolling Stones". She studied tourism after high-school, without stopping to dream about a musical career. In 2010, at the age of 18, inspired by her already-famous older cousin Khansa Batma (Mohamed Batma's daughter), she took part in a Moroccan musical competition, called Studio 2M, broadcast on 2M TV, in the Oriental category. She sang various songs of both Moroccan and Middle-Eastern repertoires, and reached the semi-finals. Even if she didn't reach the final, she managed to release a single "Aalash Tgheeb" (Why are you hiding?) in Moroccan Arabic which didn't become very successful. But she realized that she would need to go further to get the career she was expecting and Arab Idol was a great venue to reach the Arab World heart.

Breakthrough 

On 8 September 2011, Batma auditioned for the Arabic music competition Arab Idol. The show is the pan-Arab version of Pop Idol and a rebirth of Future TV's show Super Star. The winner of the competition should win a contract with recording label Platinum Records and Chevrolet Corvette (C6) as well as an important advertisement campaign with Pepsi.

She auditioned in Casablanca, and performed La Tfaker (by late Tunisian singer Thekra) in front of the jury composed by Lebanese pop singer Ragheb Alama, Emirati diva Ahlam and Egyptian music producer and musician Hassan Shaf'ei. They invited her to join in, which introduce her to the Arab audience. She was selected in the top 10 against contestants from Tunisia, Syria, Jordan, Saudi Arabia, Iraq and Egypt.

Batma's vocal abilities amazed the members of the jury and made her among the favorites since the very first prime, where she performed Talal Maddah's "Magadir". Her performance was so strong and so intense that it made Ahlam cry out of emotion. She then excelled in various dialects and various styles from classic Egyptian songs (Umm Kulthum, Mohammed Abdel Wahab, Warda, Faiza Ahmed), to Arabic pop music (Samira Said, Fulla, Najwa Karam, Asala Nasri) and Gulf music (Ahlam, Mohammed Abdu, Talal Maddah).

Among her most notable performances were her rendition of Umm Kulthum's Darrat El Ayam, for which she received unanimous praises from the jury and her singing of Ahlam's Akhtar Men Awal Ahebak (in Gulf Arabic), for which Ahlam (the singer of this song and member of the jury) said : "It is an honor that you sung this for me".

On 24 March, she lost the title against the Egyptian contestant Carmen Suleiman.

During a press conference, Batma seized the chance to clarify that her try in the Middle East is due to the opportunities that can be offered there, and added that "the launch of my artistic career from the East won't affect my contribution to the promotion of Moroccan art, and won't also affect my pride of my mother tongue". Many viewers noticed that Batma didn't use her Moroccan Arabic whenever she was speaking in front of the audiences and switched to another Arabic dialect (mostly the Khaliji dialect) as most Moroccan artists usually do when they travel to the Middle East. She considers Asma Lamnawar and Hoda Saad as role models.

After the show, the CEO of Saudi Platinum Records, Rashed Al-Majed, signed her to the label, saying that her voice was "rare".

Performances in Arab Idol 

 First casting (Casablanca) : "La Tfaker" by Thekra
 Second casting (Beirut) : "Hob Eih" by Umm Kulthum
 Top 10 Girls : "Magadir" by Talal Maddah
 1st Prime : "Youm Leek" by Thekra
 2nd Prime : "Darrat El Ayam" by Umm Kulthum
 3rd Prime : "Lashhad Hobbak" by Najwa Karam
 4th Prime : "Habina Wa Thabina" by Mayada El Henawi
 5th Prime : "Akhtar Min Awal Ahebak" by Ahlam
 5th Prime : "Khayna" by Rashed Al-Majed and Asma Lamnawar
 6th Prime : "Olli A'amalak Eh Albi" by Mohammed Abdel Wahab
 6th Prime : "Aal Bal" by Samira Said
 7th Prime : "Ma Aad Badri" by Mohammed Abdu
 7th Prime : "Akthar" by Asala Nasri
 8th Prime : "Tab Wa Ana Mali" by Warda Al-Jazairia
 8th Prime : "Wagif Aala Babikom" by Naima Samih
 8th Prime : "Tashakurat" by Fulla
 Final : "Allah Ya Moulana" by Nass El Ghiwane
 Final : "Ebta'ad Aani" by Talal Maddah
 Final : "Marsoul El Hob" by Abdelwahab Doukkali
 Final : "Hob Eih" by Umm Kulthum

Medleys in Saturday's results show

 1st Prime's Results : "Yalli Bjamalek" by Saber Rebaï
 2nd Prime's Results : "Bataminak" by Sherine
 3rd Prime's Results : "Bab Am Yabki" by Assi El Helani
 4th Prime's Results : "Bin Edeya" by Majid El Muhandes
 5th Prime's Results : "Bilba'lak" by Nawal El-Zoughby
 6th Prime's Results : "Law Taarafo" by Elissa
 7th Prime's Results : "Zidini Ashqan" by Kadhem Al Saher
 8th Prime Results : "Akhasmak Ah" and "El Donia Helwa" by Nancy Ajram
 8th Prime Results : "Sit El Habayeb" by Fayza Ahmed

Discography

References

External links 
 Youtube Channel for Dounia Batma's performances in Arab Idol
 Présentation

1991 births
People from Casablanca
21st-century Moroccan women singers
Moroccan film actresses
Moroccan television actresses
Living people
Contestants from Arabic singing competitions